Alexander Buchan (died 17 April 1769) was a Scottish landscape artist. He is known for his participation in the 1768–1771 first voyage of James Cook aboard , where he was one of the artists in the entourage of botanist Joseph Banks. Buchan had from epilepsy. On the journey, he had two documented seizures, the first during an expedition in Tierra del Fuego. Buchan died after the second seizure, shortly after Endeavours arrival at Tahiti, and was buried at sea. Buchan produced landscapes, coastal views, ethnographic drawings and natural history drawings. He is best known for illustrations of the people of Tierra del Fuego, some of which were engraved for publication in accounts of the voyage. All of his drawings from the voyage were taken by his employer Joseph Banks and are now in the British Library and the Natural History Museum, London.

Background 
Nothing is known about the early life of Buchan, but he was described as having been "young" when he was hired by Joseph Banks to go on the first voyage of James Cook. According to Averil Lysaght, an expert on Banks, there is no evidence that Buchan exhibited work in London, but Banks, who had many Scottish contacts, could have heard about Buchan's ethnographically precise and unromantic work through one of them. However, Lysaght found no direct evidence for a connection of Buchan with either Banks' Scottish friends or with the Buchan family of North Berwick, Scotland. It is unclear whether Banks knew that Buchan was an epileptic before the start of his employment. It is also not known how Buchan learned to draw. According to the art historian Bernard Smith, Buchan was not academically trained in figure drawing, but had likely learned through self-study by making copies of engravings. An oil painting showing Buchan exists, which in 1979 was in the possession of Christopher Crowder. It has been proposed that it is a self portrait, which would make it the artist's only known work before the voyage on the Endeavour.

Voyage with Captain Cook 

On the first voyage of James Cook, the naturalist Joseph Banks was accompanied by a party of eight people, including the two artists Sydney Parkinson and Alexander Buchan, with the latter engaged for landscape and figure drawing. Banks' original plan was to have Parkinson draw faithful representations of plants and animals, and to have Buchan draw the scenery and natives. Both Parkinson and Buchan also drew coastal profiles, possibly on Cook's suggestion. Such views of the coast were often used as navigational aids and included in charts. It is possible that Cook himself instructed Buchan and Herman Spöring Jr., Banks' scientific secretary, in the drawing of views, as the work of both has similarities to Cook's own coastal views. Banks' associates produced work that was more accurate than the usual standard of the Royal Navy.

Buchan is not mentioned often in the surviving journals from the voyage. In Banks' journals, his first appearance is a note that Buchan drew views of the Cape Verde islands on 30 September 1768. Buchan's epilepsy first comes up in Banks' journal during an expedition in Tierra del Fuego. Endeavour lay at anchor in the Bay of Good Success on 15 January 1769. On 16 January, a group of eleven people including Banks, Daniel Solander, Buchan and four of Banks' servants went on an expedition in the country, attempting to reach the top of the hills. During this, Buchan had an epileptic seizure, a fire was lit, and the servants stayed with Buchan while Banks and others went on to search for alpine plants. On their return, the weather became cold and it started to snow, making it impossible to return to the ship. Two of Banks' servants, Richmond and Dorlton, got drunk on whiskey and died from exposure that night, but Buchan recovered.

On 20 January, Banks visited an Ona village, very likely together with Buchan, whose drawing of An Indian Town at Terra del Fuego (engraved as View of a Village in the Bay of Good Success, in the Island of Terra del Fuego) illustrates Banks' description:

Death at Tahiti 
From Tierra del Fuego, the Endeavour continued to Tahiti in order to observe the 1769 transit of Venus, arriving at the island on 13 April. He died at Matavai Bay on 17 April 1769. James Cook wrote in his journal:  This was the first mention of Buchan in Cook's journals. In a first draft of Cook's journal, he also stated about Buchan, "there are now none on board who understands this sort of drawing."

On Banks' suggestion, Buchan's body was buried at sea as not to disturb the natives. Banks wrote of his employee's death: 
After Buchan's death, his duties in drawing people and landscapes fell to Parkinson and Spöring.

Artworks and legacy 
Following Buchan's death, Banks took possession of all his drawings from the voyage. Buchan's natural history drawings are now in the British Natural History Museum, and include some drawings in pen and watercolour of marine animals from the coast of Brazil, as well as a cockroach from Madeira. The remaining material has been held by the British Library, since 1827, when Robert Brown transferred the library of Joseph Banks to the British Museum.

Buchan's best-known works are his illustrations of the people of western Tierra del Fuego, made during a stopover at the Bay of Success. For publication in John Hawkesworth's An Account of the Voyages (1773), Buchan's sketches were changed extensively by Giovanni Battista Cipriani to conform with Hawkesworth's interpretation of the Fuegians. Cipriani added additional figures to Buchan's Inhabitants of the island of Tierra del Fuego, in their hut before the images were engraved by Francesco Bartolozzi. Cipriani and Bartolozzi both had a classical education as history painters trained at the Accademia di Belle Arti di Firenze, and Cipriani used classical motifs to change the "wretched" inhabitants of the hut in Buchan's sketch into "comely youth and wise old men". However, the exposed genitals of the men in the image accurately follow both the description by Banks and Buchan's original. Another one of Buchan's drawings, of a village on Tierra del Fuego, was obtained by Sydney Parkinson's brother Stanfield from Banks, engraved by James Newton and published in Parkinson's Journal of a Voyage to the South Seas.

References

Sources 

1769 deaths
Landscape artists
Burials at sea
Year of birth missing
Scottish artists
Scottish explorers
James Cook
18th-century Scottish painters